LeAnne Howe (born April 29, 1951, Choctaw Nation of Oklahoma) is an American author and Eidson Distinguished Professor in the Department of English at the University of Georgia, Athens. She previously taught American Indian Studies and English at the University of Minnesota and at the University of Illinois at Urbana-Champaign.

Early life and education
LeAnne Howe was born into a Choctaw family in Edmond, Oklahoma, and attended local schools as a child. She later attended Oklahoma State University, where she majored in English. She is an enrolled member of the Choctaw Nation.

Years later, Howe returned to studies, gaining a Master of Fine Arts degree in 2000 in Creative Writing from Vermont College of Norwich University. Over the next few years, she began to shift toward the academic world. She taught, lectured and developed courses in Native American Studies at the University of Iowa and at Carleton College in Northfield, Minnesota.

Career
Howe is an author, playwright, scholar, and poet. She has explored Native American experiences through writing screenplays. She has also written fiction, creative non-fiction, plays, and poetry. She has conducted public readings of her work, and has lectured in Japan, Jordan, Israel, Romania, and Spain.

Howe's work has been published in various journals and anthologies.

Honors and awards
She received the Before Columbus Foundation's American Book Award in 2002 for her novel Shell Shaker. In 2006, Howe's collection of poetry Evidence of Red (Salt Publishing, UK 2005) won the Oklahoma Book Award. In 2012, Howe was the recipient of a United States Artists Fellow award. In 2015, Howe was awarded the first MLA Prize for Studies in Native American Literatures, Cultures, and Languages for her second novel, titled Choctalking On Other Realities (Aunt Lute Books, 2013).

Books
Shell Shaker, Aunt Lute Books, San Francisco, 2001
Evidence of Red: Poems and Prose, Salt Publishing, UK, 2005
Miko Kings: An Indian Baseball Story, Aunt Lute Books, 2007
Seeing Red, Pixeled Skins, American Indians and Film, Michigan State University Press, East Lansing, MI, 2013
Choctalking on Other Realities, Aunt Lute Books, San Francisco, 2013
"Singing, Still, Libretto for the 1847 Choctaw Gift to the Irish for Famine Relief," The Irish Times
Savage Conversations, Coffee House Press, 2019

Plays
The Mascot Opera (Alexander Street Press, 2008)
Big PowWow
Indian Radio Days (Theatre C. G.,1998)

Films
 Co-editor with Harvey Markowitz, and Denise K. Cummings, Seeing Red, Pixeled Skins: American Indians and Film, 2013
Co-producer with James Fortier for Playing Pastimes: American Indian Fast-Pitch Softball, and Survival, 2007
Screenwriter and on-camera narrator for Indian Country Diaries: Spiral of Fire, 2006

See also
 List of writers from peoples indigenous to the Americas
 Native American Studies
 Native American dramatists and playwrights

References

External links
 Official LeAnne Howe site
https://mikokings.wordpress.com
 Voices from the Gap

Living people
Native American poets
Native American women writers
1951 births
Native American dramatists and playwrights
Native American novelists
Choctaw Nation of Oklahoma people
21st-century American novelists
Sinte Gleska University faculty
University of Illinois Urbana-Champaign faculty
University of Georgia faculty
American women dramatists and playwrights
American women poets
American women novelists
21st-century American women writers
21st-century American poets
American Book Award winners
Novelists from Illinois
Novelists from Georgia (U.S. state)
American women academics
20th-century Native Americans
21st-century Native Americans
20th-century Native American women
21st-century Native American women